Raymond Duncan or Ray Duncan may refer to:

 Raymond Duncan (dancer) (1874–1966), American dancer, artist, poet, craftsman, and philosopher
 Raymond Duncan (entrepreneur) (1930–2015), American entrepreneur and vintner
 Raymond Duncan (ornithologist), Scottish ornithologist